Arne Bergsgård (18 April 1886 – 18 June 1954) was a Norwegian historian and educator.

Biography
Arne Bergsgård was  born in Vestre Slidre in Oppland and grew up in Vang, Norway. He was the son of Asle Bergsgård  and Ingeborg Thune. He attended high school in Fredrikstad, where he graduated in 1904. In 1910, he received his philology degree. He served as a teacher from 1911 to 1914 in Volda, and from 1914 to 1922 at Stord. In 1922, he was appointed a senior lecturer in history at the Norwegian College of General Sciences in Trondheim. He earned his PhD in 1933 with a thesis on Ole Gabriel Ueland, and in 1935 he became a professor. He was rector of the college from 1937 to 1953. He was a board member of Noregs Mållag from 1929 to 1936.

During the occupation of Norway by Nazi Germany he joined the resistance movement, editing the underground publication I krigstid. He was a member of the postwar investigation committee, Undersøkelseskommisjonen av 1945, where he wrote the appendix on the Norwegian Government's Foreign Policy up to April 1940.

As a historian, he concentrated largely on the 19th century, primarily the emergence of Norwegian national identity. He became a member of Royal Norwegian Society of Sciences and Letters in 1926 and the Norwegian Academy of Science and Letters in 1938. He was decorated Knight, First Class of the Order of St. Olav in 1950.

References

External links
Arne Bergsgård private archive is kept at NTNU University Library

1886 births
1954 deaths
People from Vestre Slidre
20th-century Norwegian historians
Noregs Mållag
Norwegian resistance members
Norwegian editors
Royal Norwegian Society of Sciences and Letters